Louisville is the largest city in the U.S. Commonwealth of Kentucky.

Louisville may also refer to several places:

Cities and communities 

 Louisville/Jefferson County metro government (balance), Kentucky, a statistical entity corresponding to that portion of the consolidated city-county entity that does not include any of the 83 incorporated places in the consolidated city-county
 Louisville metropolitan area, the metropolitan area of Louisville, Kentucky
 Louisville, Alabama
 Louisville, Belize in Central America
 Louisville, California, former name of Greenwood, El Dorado County, California
 Louisville, Colorado
 Louisville, Georgia (a former state capital)
 Louisville, Illinois
 Louisville, Kansas
 Louisville, Maryland
 Louisville, Mississippi
 Louisville, Chariton County, Missouri
 Louisville, Lincoln County, Missouri
 Louisville, Nebraska
 Louisville State Recreation Area, located in Louisville, NE
 Louisville, New York
 Louisville, Ohio
 Louisville, Adams County, Ohio
 Louisville Ridge in the South Pacific Ocean

 Louisville, Tennessee
 Louisville Township, Minnesota (disambiguation)
 St. Louisville, Ohio

Other uses 
 The University of Louisville, a public university in Louisville, Kentucky, a member of the Kentucky state university system, often called just Louisville
 The Louisville Cardinals, the intercollegiate athletic program of the above university, also often called just Louisville
 Louisville, a magazine published about Louisville, Kentucky

See also 
 Louiseville
 Lewisville (disambiguation)
 Louis (disambiguation)
 USS Louisville